Athletics competitions at the 1993 Bolivarian Games were held at the Estadio Félix Capriles in Cochabamba, Bolivia, between April 24 - May 2, 1993.

Gold medal winners from Ecuador were published by the Comité Olímpico Ecuatoriano.

A total of 43 events were contested, 24 by men and 19 by women.

Medal summary

Medal winners were published.

All results are marked as "affected by altitude" (A), because the stadium in Cochabamba is located at 2,582 m above sea level.

Men

Notes
†: short course (about 39.5 km)

Women

Notes
†: short course (about 39.5 km)

Medal table (unofficial)

References

Athletics at the Bolivarian Games
International athletics competitions hosted by Bolivia
Bolivarian Games
1993 in Bolivian sport